Rudolph Polk (25 November 1892 New York, New York – 16 June 1957 Los Angeles) was an American concert violinist based in New York City during his early years and, during his later years, a Hollywood film director, film industry executive, and artist manager for Jascha Heifetz, Vladimir Horowitz, José Iturbi, and Gregor Piatigorsky. In Hollywood, Polk was the assistant musical director to Morris Stoloff at Columbia Pictures. After World War II, Polk was musical director for Enterprise Studios.

Polk was family friends with Jacob Previn, father of André and Steve Previn.

Musical training 
Polk graduated from the Hochschule für Musik in Berlin where he studied violin with Henri Marteau. He performed many times with the Berlin Philharmonic in the Early 1920s. He also toured with Feodor Chaliapin (and his longtime piano accompanyist, Fyodor Keneman) in the United States.  Polk also studied composition with Paul Juon.

Filmography 
As music supervisor
 They Shall Have Music, Jascha Heifetz (as himself) (1939) (Polk is uncredited)
As musical director
 Body and Soul, Enterprise Productions, Inc. (1947)
 The Other Love (1947)
 Ramrod (1947)
 Arch of Triumph, Enterprise Productions, Inc. (1948)
 Four Faces West, Enterprise Studios (1948)
 No Minor Vices (1948)
 Caught, Enterprise Productions, Inc. (1949)
 A Kiss for Corliss (1949)
As songwriter
 Arch of Triumph, Enterprise Productions, Inc. (1948)
 Song:  Long After Tonight, music by Rudolph Polk, words by Ervin Drake (Polk is uncredited in the film)
As producer
 Adventures in Music, Artist Films, Inc. (documentary) (1944)
 Of Men and Music (documentary) (1951)
 Jan Peerce, Marian Anderson & Andrés Segovia, produced by Rudolph Polk and Bernard Luber; director, Irving Reis; writer, Harry Hurnitz
As film scorer
 The Private Affairs of Bel Ami (1947)
 Polk was borrowed from Enterprise Studios to score the film
 Force of Evil

Television 
As producer
 Adventures of Superman (1952 series)

Family 
Rudolph married Pauline née Stone (1896–1986) in Manhattan, New York, on Mar 16, 1919.  They had two children, Peter and Martha (Hamilton).

Posthumous memorial scholarship 
Jascha Heifetz and Gregor Piatigorsky helped fund the posthumous Rudolph Polk Memorial Scholarship at Claremont Colleges.

References 
General references
 Biography Index. A cumulative index to biographical material in books and magazines. Volume 4: September 1955 – August 1958, H. W. Wilson Company, New York (1960)
 Obituaries on File, Two volumes, compiled by Felice D. Levy (1917–1990),'' Facts on File, New York (1979)

Inline citations

American male violinists
Musicians from New York City
Berlin University of the Arts alumni
1892 births
1957 deaths
20th-century American violinists
Film directors from New York City
20th-century American male musicians